Founded by cabinet maker Jacques Saoutchik (born Iakov Savtchuk in Russian Empire in 1880), Saoutchik was a French coachbuilding company founded in 1906. In the 1930s, the company became well known for their often extravagant automobile designs for high end luxury car manufacturers. After Jacques died in 1955, the company passed into the hands of his son Pierre. With most of the well known French luxury car manufacturers going out of business and independent automotive coachbuilding as an industry in decline, the market for Saoutchik designs evaporated and the company ceased trading in 1955.

The company was known for designing flamboyant and expensive automobile bodies for brands such as Bugatti, Delahaye, Pegaso, Hispano-Suiza and others.

References

External links
 Coachbuild.com Encyclopedia: Saoutchik

Coachbuilders of France
Manufacturing companies established in 1906
Defunct companies of France
Design companies established in 1906
French companies established in 1906
Manufacturing companies disestablished in 1955
Design companies disestablished in 1955
1955 disestablishments in France